Scharsee is a lake in Kreis Plön, Schleswig-Holstein, Germany. At an elevation of 20.8 m, its surface area is 0.363 km².

Lakes of Schleswig-Holstein